Loingsech, an Irish language male name meaning exile or sailor, might refer to:
 Labraid Loingsech, a legendary high king of Ireland and ancestor of the Laigin
 Loingsech mac Colmáin (died 655), king of Leinster
 Loingsech mac Óengusso (died 704), high king of Ireland